Marcos Norberto Conigliaro (born December 9, 1942) is an Argentine football coach and former professional player.

Biography
Conigliaro was born in Quilmes.  As a player, he was a forward renowned for his technical ability. He played for many clubs in Argentina and abroad. His debut in Argentina was with Quilmes at the age of 15. He then played for Independiente, Chacarita Juniors, Estudiantes, Jalisco, K.S.V. Oudenaarde, Lugano, and Everton. In 1965, he arrived to Estudiantes de La Plata, who were a dominant force in Argentine and South American football during the late 1960s. During his time in Estudiantes, Conigliaro won three Copa Libertadores and the 1968 Intercontinental Cup. In the first game of the Intercontinental Cup, he scored the winning and only goal against Manchester United.

Overall, Conigliaro played in 277 games, scoring 65 goals.

As a player, he won seven championships: six playing for Estudiantes (1967 Metropolitano, 1968-1970 Copa Libertadores, 1968 Intercontinental Cup, and 1969 Interamericana Cup ) and one playing for Independiente (1963 AFA Championship).

After he retired from soccer, Conigliaro became a coach. He coached Unión de Santa Fe in the Argentine first division. Since 1996, he has been coaching Atlético San Jorge de Santa Fe, which plays in the Argentino B  division.

References

External links
 Marcos Conigliaro at BDFA.com.ar 
  

1942 births
Living people
Argentine football managers
Argentine footballers
Argentine expatriate footballers
Quilmes Atlético Club footballers
Estudiantes de La Plata footballers
Chacarita Juniors footballers
FC Lugano players
Everton de Viña del Mar footballers
Argentine Primera División players
Liga MX players
Expatriate footballers in Chile
Expatriate footballers in Mexico
Expatriate footballers in Belgium
Expatriate footballers in Switzerland
Association football forwards
People from Quilmes
Sportspeople from Buenos Aires Province
Unión de Santa Fe managers